Mohammad Habibu Tijani is a Ghanaian politician and former member of the Seventh Parliament of the Fourth Republic of Ghana representing the Yendi Constituency in the Northern Region on the ticket of the New Patriotic Party.

Early life and education
Tijani was born on 16 February 1965. He hails from Sanguli in the Northern Region of Ghana.He went to Ghana College, now Ghana Senior High School(GHANASCO), Tamale.He received his Teachers' Certificate 'A' in 1989 from the Bagabaga Training College, he later proceeded to the University of Ghana where he obtained his Bachelor of Arts (BA) degree in the Study of Religion with first class honours in 2000. He holds a master's degree in Governance and Leadership which he obtained from the Ghana Institute of Management and Public Administration (GIMPA) in 2012 and a post graduate diploma in education which he received in 2016 from Valley View University, Oyibi.

Career
Tijani is a teacher by profession. He was a tutor for Yendi Senior High School 1995 to 1997. and also served as the assistant director in charge of Monitoring and Supervision for Central Gonja District Office of the Ghana Education Service from 2009 to 2013. He is also an Islamic Cleric. Habib Tijani was the Municipal Chief Executive for Yendi from 2001 to 2009.

Politics
Tijani served as the municipal chief executive for Yendi from 2001 to 2009. He entered parliament on 7 January 2013 on the ticket of the New Patriotic Party. He was re-elected in the 2016 Ghanaian general election to represent the Yendi Constituency for a second parliamentary term. In 2017, he was appointed deputy minister for Foreign Affairs.  He is part of the Works and Housing, Business and House Committees of Parliament. He has helped his constituents in many ways, including  facilitating the following projects:

 Setting up of the Yendi College of Health Sciences in Yendi
 Building of Maternal and Child Health Care Centres in Yendi
 Construction of 37 units of 3 Classroom Blocks in Yendi
 Construction of 13 units of 6 Classroom Blocks in the Yendi Municipality
 Construction of 13 CHPS Compounds in the Yendi Municipality

Personal life
He is married with four children. He identifies as a Muslim.

References

Ghanaian MPs 2017–2021
1965 births
Living people
Ghanaian Muslims
New Patriotic Party politicians